Dromore Amateurs Football Club is a Northern Irish, intermediate football club playing in the Intermediate B Division of the Mid-Ulster Football League. The club had played in Division 1C of the Northern Amateur Football League before switching in 2017. The club is based in Dromore, County Down, and was formed in 1958 and played at Mountview Park until 1998 when it moved to Ferris Park. Club colours are amber and black.

External links
 Club web site
 nifootball.co.uk - (For fixtures, results and tables of all Northern Ireland amateur football leagues)

Notes

Association football clubs in Northern Ireland
Association football clubs established in 1958
Association football clubs in County Down
Northern Amateur Football League clubs
Mid-Ulster Football League clubs
1958 establishments in Northern Ireland